Thor was created by Stan Lee, Larry Lieber and Jack Kirby. There had been multiple alternative versions of Thor, both in the main continuity as well as alternate stories. The character is based on the Norse Mythological deity Thor.

Prime Earth (Earth-616)

Red Norvell
Part of a documentary crew brought to Asgard by Loki, Roger "Red" Norvell meets and falls in love with Lady Sif. Red Norvell is given Thor's Iron Gauntlets and Belt of Strength by Loki to compete with Thor for Sif's affections, beating him and taking his hammer, with neither realizing this was part of a master plan by Odin to create a surrogate God of Thunder to die fighting the Serpent of Ragnarok and fulfill the prophecy.

Thori
Thori is the pet of Thor. Thori is a Hel-Hound who can exude flames, track beings across dimensional planes, and, alone among his litter, speak.

Beta Ray Bill
Beta Ray Bill is the champion of the Korbinites, an alien race. Debuting in Thor #337, the character was initially intended to be a surprise as an apparent monster who unexpectedly proves to be actually a great hero. As such, Bill becomes the first being outside of the Marvel Universe's Norse pantheon to be deemed worthy enough to wield Thor's hammer, Mjolnir. After an initial rivalry for possession of the weapon, both the Thunder God and the alien warrior reconciled as staunch allies.  Bill is granted a war hammer of his own called Stormbreaker, which grants him the same powers as Thor. He has since made numerous appearances.

Eric Masterson

Thor initially bonded with architect Eric Masterson to save the latter's life when he was injured as a bystander during one of Thor's battles. The bonding allows Masterson to transform into Thor while Thor's mind gains control. Later, Thor is punished for apparently killing Loki and exiled. Masterson retains possession of Mjolnir and the ability to transform into Thor's form, continuing his roles as a member of the Avengers and protector of Earth. Thor is eventually released from exile, but asks that Masterson continue serving as in his stead. Tricked by the Enchantress Masterson attacks Thor, and soon after relinquishes Mjolnir to Thor. In gratitude for his services, Odin provides Masterson with an enchanted mace, Thunderstrike, the name of which he uses as his new code name. He later heroically sacrifices himself to defeat the Egyptian god Set. The weapon and name Thunderstrike are later taken up by Masterson's son Kevin.

Jane Foster

Marvel announced that in October 2014 there will be a new Thor who is female. As revealed in the aftermath of the Original Sin storyline, Thor lost his ability to wield Mjolnir, which was later found by Jane Foster who obtains Thor's power and his name. Thor, unaware of his successor's identity and believing Jane Foster would not be able to use Mjolnir due to her cancer, used the battle axe Jarnbjorn.

Alternative continuities

Thor 1602

A version of Thor appears with an alter ego of an elderly Christian priest named Donal—an allusion to Thor's original secret identity Donald Blake. Donal fears and despises his alter-ego, believing that the shared existence will damn him. This version of Thor speaks in Anglo-Saxon alliterative verse rather than the Shakespearean English that the mainstream universe Thor speaks in.

Thor 2099
Set in the year 2099, the role of Thor is taken by a man named Cecil MacAdam, who belongs to a class of priests known as "Thorites" who worship the original version of Thor. Avatarr, the CEO of Alchemax, grants him and others the powers of the Norse gods, along with brainwashing that both convinces them they are the gods and keeps them under his control Later, in "2099: Manifest Destiny", a rejuvenated Steve Rogers finds Mjolnir and becomes the new Thor. He gives Mjolnir to Miguel O'Hara (Spider-Man 2090) at the end of the story.

Age of Apocalypse
In this continuity, Donald Blake never discovers Mjolnir and thus never becomes Thor. Blake, as a member of the Human High Council, meets with Mikhail Rasputin (one of Apocalypse's horsemen) for peace talks. Knowing the mutant would never keep his word, Blake stabbed him through the chest with his cane and shoved him out a window, where both fell to their deaths.

Amalgam Comics
In the Amalgam Comics universe, Thor is joined with Orion to form Thorion. Thorion was the son of Thanoseid (Thanos/Darkseid), but was traded to All-Highfather Odin in order to seal a truce between the realms of Apokolips and New Asgard.

During one adventure, L'ok D'saad (An amalgamation of Loki and Desaad), he for whom Thorion was traded, sought to use the Mother Cube (a mixture of a Mother box and the Cosmic Cube) and its Infinity Essence to awaken the Sleeping One called Surtur and bring about a second Ragnarok that would end everything. Thorion, however, invoked the power of the Source via his hammer to halt L'ok's evil wishes. Because of the great energies released during their conflict, Thorion was remade into a cosmic being known as The Celestial.

In Unlimited Access, a limited series which further explored themes introduced in DC vs. Marvel, the hero known as Access formed an amalgamation of what appeared to be the Silver Age versions of Thor and Superman (in his then-current blue energy form). Together, they were known as Thor-El.

Earth-56377
On Earth-56377, there is a version of Thor who had since been unworthy to wield Mjolnir as it had failed him when the Masters of Evil burned Asgard to a cinder and also when Midgard was further defiled by them. Since those days, Thor had been stalked by Mjolnir which led to Mjolnir following him to the Himalayas. After hurting his hand punching Mjolnir, Thor is approached by the Ghost of Lei Kung who takes him into K'un-Lun which was also desecrated by the Masters of Evil where its Iron Fist fell in battle and Shou-Lao is behind its doors weakened but alive. When Thor mentions how he has been unworthy of Mjolnir, Lei Kung claims that Thor is not worthy to wield hammers and that he will train him to wield the Iron Fist move. Thor undergoes the training for it while repeatedly hurting his hand. After the training, Thor successfully subdued Mjolnir. Then Lei Kung fights Thor which led to Thor using what he has learned to send Lei Kung into Shou-Lao's chambers. It is here that Thor finds that Shou-Lao had passed away at some point. Before he disappears, Lei Kung advises Thor to use his "weapons" well. As Mjolnir acts up again, Thor allows it to come as a companion while advising it to stay out of his way. As Thor and Mjolnir leave the ruins of K'un-Lun, they are approached by Ghost Rider and Ant-Man who are looking for a Thor and offer him a ride.

This version of Thor would later be nicknamed the "God of Fists" when Ant-Man recaps on who he, Ghost Rider, and Ghost Rider's Deathlok companion have recruited so far.

When the Council of Red attack Avengers Tower in the God Quarry, Thor and Mjolnir faced off against a giant member of the Council of Red when it made its way to Avengers Tower. Thor used his "iron fist" move to slay the giant Council of Red member. After the remaining members of the Council of Red retreated when most of its numbers were decimated by Old Man Phoenix and the granddaughters of King Thor, Thor was among those who fought the Doctor Doom variants loyal to Doom Supreme. Thor accompanied Captain Marvel and Nighthawk into going beneath the God Quarry where they find a small Mephisto variant who gets absorbed into Mephisto.

Iron Hammer
During the "Infinity Wars" storyline, where the universe was combined in half, Thor was fused with Iron Man creating Iron Hammer. Sigurd Stark was the fifth richest person on the world thanks to his genius about technology. However, due to his lack of memories five years earlier, he was driven to drink. After going through the Norvegian, he was attacked by some Dark Elves, led by Krimson Kurse (fusion of Crimson Dynamo and Kurse). He got poisoned by an arrow, slowing killing him, and taken by the Elves to aid their other prisoner Eitri (fusion of Eitri and Ho Yinsen) in order to build powerful weapons for the Elves. Then, Sigurd became friends with Eitri and together they build an armor, that prevented the poison from killing Sigurd, along with a hammer in order to escape the Dark Elves. However, during their escape, Eitri is killed. After Sigurd defeated the Elves and Krimson Kurse, he discovered that Krimson was his lost friend, who had turned into a Thrall to be a servant to Dark Elves, and after that he killed his friend out of mercy. Sigurd then decided to go to the All-Father on Asgard, to seek help into defeating Malekith (fusion of Malekith and Mandarin), and with the help of his A.I. assistant H.E.I.M.D.A.L.L. (fusion of Heimdall and J.A.R.V.I.S.) opened the B.I.F.R.O.S.T. and went to Asgard. When travelling, he remembered his old memories: his true name was Stark Odinson who, due to his arrogance, his father Howard Odin (fusion of Howard Stark and Odin) banished his son to Earth, where he would learn how is like to be a mortal. Upon arriving, Malekith had trapped the Aesir and had allied with Madame Hel (fusion of Madame Masque and Hela) and Stane Odinson (fusion of Loki and Obadiah Stane). Luckily, Iron Hammer was able to defeat Malekith and Odin allowed his son to become a god again. However, Sigurd refused, feeling better as a human.

King Thor
King Thor first appears in Thor: God of Thunder #1 where his reality takes place on Earth-14412. He is visually based on Odin, having only one eye, but in addition one of his arms is replaced by one of the arms of the Destroyer armor. He also is in possession of the Odinforce, now renamed the Thor Force. He also has adapted some of Odin's mannerisms, notably his bitterness and cynicism. Until further continuity changes, this version of Thor seems to be the destined future of the Prime/Earth-616 Thor.

Millennia from the present, Thor becomes the All-Father of Asgard. However, some time before this, Loki successfully destroys the Earth, and King Thor comes to him for revenge for killing everyone he loves. Loki raises an army of undead from the corpses of the Avengers, and Thor fights them off before Loki retreats into the past to corrupt the Thor of the present. This experience leaves Thor a bitter and cynical king, much like his father.

Some time after this, Gorr the God Butcher razes Asgard with an army of Black Berserkers, killing or capturing its inhabitants. Gorr spares King Thor as a form of torture, marooning him in the ruins of Asgard to look back on his failures, keeping him there with an army of Black Berserkers to guard him. King Thor remains imprisoned in Asgard for 900 years, only to be liberated when the Prime Thor travels through time in pursuit of Gorr, who has fled his present. Together, along with a young version of Thor from the 9th century AD, the Thors defeat Gorr and save the surviving Asgardians and other gods.

Some time after this, Galactus returns to Earth to consume what is left of it. King Thor, having grown sentimental over what the Earth once was, attempts to fight Galactus off, but is blasted into space by the Devourer of Worlds. King Thor retrieves All-Black the Necrosword from the black hole he cast it in after Gorr's defeat, returns to Earth, and makes short work of Galactus, sparing the Devourer of Worlds only when he collapses from the exhaustion of the battle. During this, King Thor's blood restores life to Earth. King Thor then agrees to let Galactus live and gives him leave to consume Mars in exchange for his life. However, Galactus acquires All-Black shortly after this and goes on a planet killing spree across the universe, becoming the Butcher of Worlds.

Millennia later, King Thor and his granddaughters repopulate the Earth with flora and fauna like multi-tusked elephants and different hybrids. Thor personally created two new humans, naming them Jane and Steve.

During the "Secret Wars" storyline, King Thor was recreated on Battleworld where he became the Lawspeaker of the Thor Corps.

After Earth-14412 was restored, he human race steadily regrows and prospers under Thor's guidance. However, the universe eventually starts to get consumed by entropy. King Thor heads to the edge of the universe in an attempt to stop it, only to be confronted by an older version of Wolverine, who is now in possession of the Phoenix Force. Logan is bitter at Thor for having disrupted the natural order of things out of sentiment, warning him that his actions have attracted the attention of Doctor Doom, who is still alive in this time and in possession of the Starbrand, the Iron Fist, the Spirit of Vengeance, and is also the Sorcerer Supreme. Doom returns to Earth to conquer it only to be opposed by King Thor and Old Man Phoenix. After their combined might still proves to be unable to defeat Doom, Logan sacrifices himself by transferring the Phoenix Force into Mjolnir, imbuing Thor with the power of the Phoenix. Phoenix King Thor fights Doom in the Earth's mantle for 99 years, emerging victorious but collapsing into the Forever Sleep to recover from his efforts.

Some time later, Loki attacks Asgard again, this time in possession of All-Black the Necrosword, wanting to kill Thor once and for all. However, in the midst of their battle, Loki is unexpectedly stabbed by Gorr, whose consciousness has remained in All-Black for all these years. Thor, Loki, and Thor's granddaughters attempt to kill Gorr, but Gorr has transcended mortality by becoming one with All-Black, which has also been perfuming itself throughout the universe, slowly destroying it. King Thor finally defeats All-Black after it takes over a massive black hole, traveling to its center and unleashing his full power. This destroys All-Black with the foundations of the universe and renders Gorr mortal, this time with amnesia. Eventually, King Thor leaves Earth in the care of his granddaughters, and sails to the edge of the universe in Skidbladnir to stave off the inevitable entropy.

Marvel Noir
While Thor does not appear in Marvel Noir, the Noir version of Baron Zemo reveals that his castle was previously inhabited by a mad Norse Man who believed that he was a God of Asgard, and would frequently attack people with a hammer.  Zemo holds up his skeleton, and the skull is wearing a helmet reminiscent of Thor's original helmet in the 616 continuity.

Marvel Zombies
Briefly, Thor appears as a cannibalistic zombie wielding a makeshift version of a hammer composed of a concrete block and pipe as he is no longer worthy to wield Mjolnir, which he breaks when trying to attack the Silver Surfer. When the Silver Surfer is finally struck down, only a handful of zombies manage to eat a piece of his body, and Thor is not one of them. Those who did consume the Silver Surfer acquire his cosmic powers, and Thor, along with the rest of the zombies, is seemingly slaughtered. Giant-Man can be seen throwing away his skeleton after burning his body.

But in Marvel Zombies: Dead Days- a one shot prequel to the main events of the Zombie universe-, Thor is amongst the heroes on the S.H.I.E.L.D. helicarrier who survived the first wave of the zombie plague. After Reed Richards was driven insane following his construction of a device to travel to other universes, Thor, on Nick Fury's orders, destroyed the device rather than using it to escape to another dimension unaffected by the virus, in order to ensure that what had happened to their world couldn't happen to another.

Old Man Logan
During the "Old Man Logan" storyline taking place on Earth-807128, Thor was listed as the Last White Hope the day when the villains won. He was mentioned by Hawkeye to have been killed by Absorbing Man (who absorbed the magic from Scarlet Witch's corpse) and Magneto (who conjured an electromagnetic storm to make Absorbing Man stronger). Mjolnir was left on the sight of Las Vegas which was later renamed Hammer Falls.

On Earth-21923, Thor's history remained the same. A grown up Dani Cage, daughter of Luke Cage and Jessica Jones, is a recurring character in the Old Man Logan miniseries and its sequel, Dead Man Logan. In the Wastelands, Thor died many years in the past and his hammer lies in the countryside, with nobody able to lift it, and a small cult is formed around it. Dani is shot in the area, and falls next to the hammer. She takes it before dying, and becomes a new Thor. The character would be used next in the limited series Avengers of the Wastelands, which was released in January 2020.

Ruins
In Ruins an alternate universe where "everything that can go wrong will go wrong" Donald Blake (Thor's human alter ego) appears claiming to have found Mjolnir when in fact he ate hallucinogenic agaric mushrooms. However, Mjolnir appears at the site where the Avengers of this reality had perished at the hands of the United States military indicating Thor and Donald Blake are two separate people in this reality.

Thrr

In the Spider-Ham comics, which take place on Earth-8311, a universe populated by talking animal parodies of Marvel Comics characters, Thor appears as Thrr, an anthropomorphic dog from "Arfgard".

Ultimate Marvel

Thor is a member of the superhero team the Ultimates in the Ultimate Marvel Universe. Despite his claims to be a Norse god, he is regarded by many to be delusional during the first months of his career. It is not until he is seen summoning an army of Asgardian warriors to fend off an attack on Washington DC by demonic forces commanded by Loki that Thor's teammates realize he is exactly who he says he is.

What If?
In an early What If story, Jane Foster discovered the stick rather than Donald Blake, spending time as a female Thor (called Thordis) before she was recalled to Asgard, allowing Odin to return the hammer to its rightful owner, although Jane went on to be elevated to godhood so that she could marry Odin.

In What If Rogue possessed the power of Thor?, Rogue accidentally permanently absorbed Thor when she and Mystique attempted to break the Brotherhood out of prison, resulting in her killing most of the Avengers and the Brotherhood when she was unable to cope with Thor's power. Although Loki attempted to manipulate her into waging war on Asgard after she was able to lift Thor's hammer, the sight of Odin's genuine sense of loss allowed Thor's remnants to manifest in her subconscious, affirming that he was an ideal as well as a person, allowing Rogue to inherit his power and position as she became the new Thor.

In What if Thor was the Herald of Galactus?, Galactus comes to devour Asgard. His herald kills Sif and Thor kills the herald in revenge. Galactus then announces that Asgard has fed him enough, and asks Thor to become his new herald in exchange for leaving Asgard alone. Thor agrees and directs Galactus to worlds with bloodthirsty races he deems worthy of destruction. Until the day Munnin, one of Odin's ravens, reaches him to inform him that Odin is dead and Asgard has fallen. Thor returns to Asgard, now under control of Loki and the frost giants, who reveal that Galactus' coming to Asgard was part of his plan to weaken Odin. After recovering Mjolnir, which he left behind, Thor guides Galactus to Asgard to feed in order to defeat Loki, since Asgard is an insult to what it once was. Thor frees Balder and the other imprisoned Asgardians, telling them to flee to Midgard. Thor defeats Loki, but continues being Galactus' herald: if he can be bold enough to decide which world is to be devoured, he is still worthy of wielding Mjolnir. On Earth, Balder becomes the premier super hero of Chicago. Thor also later becomes the Herald of Galactus in the 2020 run of the main Thor comic book series.

Dargo Ktor
Dargo Ktor lived in a distant  dystopian future, where people of earth are oppressed by the oppressive corp. He becomes the Thor of that future after realising that he is worthy to lift mjolnir and thus fights the oppressive corp  and Loki to save his people from the oppressive regime.

Films and Television

Marvel Cinematic Universe

Thor in the Marvel Cinematic Universe (Earth-199999) is depicted as one of the most powerful Asgardians, an ancient alien civilization with long ties to Earth, who humans consider to be gods. Thor wields a powerful hammer called Mjolnir, and is initially depicted as the arrogant heir to the throne of Asgard whose brash behaviors causes turmoil among the Nine Realms under Asgard's protection. This brings him into conflict with his villainous adopted brother, Loki. Thor commits himself to the protection of Earth, and becomes a founding member of the Avengers.Thor eventually becomes the King of Asgard after Odin's death, but the entire realm is destroyed during Ragnarök, where he had to fight his sister, Hela. Following the Blip, he passes the crown of New Asgard to Valkyrie and joins the Guardians of the Galaxy. Thor later comes into conflict with Gorr the God Butcher and the Olympian god Zeus, while reconnecting with his terminally ill ex-girlfriend, the now Mjolnir-wielding Jane Foster. After Foster succumbs to her cancer to assist in Gorr's defeat, Thor adopts the latter's daughter, Love. This version of Thor is played by Australian actor Chris Hemsworth.

The Marvel Super Heroes

Thor starred in the segment "The Mighty Thor" of the animated The Marvel Super Heroes, originally syndicated in 1966. There were thirteen episodes that centered on Thor, who was voiced by Chris Wiggins who also voiced his human host Donald Blake.

The Avengers: Earth's Mightiest Heroes

Thor and the rest of Avengers are forced to battle the world's most dangerous supervillains, including Baron Zemo, the Leader, Kang the Conqueror, and Ultron, as well as the criminal organizations Hydra and A.I.M..

Thor Tales of Asgard

Thor is a young God, who must prove himself worthy of his father's ideals, while trying to stop an inevitable war between the Asgardians and frost giants.

Avengers Assemble (TV series)

Thor is 
the founding member of the Avengers. Thor is  the heavy hitter of the team as he fights evil and saves the world with his teammates. The Avengers team consist of Iron Man, Captain America, Thor, Hulk, Black Widow, Hawkeye and Falcon.

What If...?

What if  episode 7 explores what would happen if the events of the Marvel Cinematic Universe (MCU) film Thor (2011) occurred differently, with Thor growing up without his adopted brother Loki and adopting a party lifestyle.

References

Articles about multiple fictional characters
Fictional characters from parallel universes
Thor (Marvel Comics)